Phillips Mill Historic District is a national historic district located in Solebury Township, Bucks County, Pennsylvania.  The district includes 34 contributing buildings, one contributing site, and six contributing structures in the village of Phillips Mill.  

The district originally developed in the early 18th–century and is notable today as an artist's colony. It has the atmosphere of a picturesque old English village. Notable buildings and structures include the home of artist William L. Lathrop, the Phillips Mill Inn, West End Farm, Lenteboden, the Hotel du Village, Stone Cottage, and St. Philips Chapel.

It was added to the National Register of Historic Places in 1983.

Gallery

References

External links
Hotel du Village website
The Inn at Phillips Mill website

Historic districts in Bucks County, Pennsylvania
Historic districts on the National Register of Historic Places in Pennsylvania
National Register of Historic Places in Bucks County, Pennsylvania